Tolumnia guttata is a species of orchid found from Mexico, Belize to Colombia and the Caribbean.

References

guttata
Orchids of Central America
Orchids of Belize
Plants described in 1753
Taxa named by Carl Linnaeus